The Minister without portfolio for Civilian Intelligence Services of Hungary, nicknamed the Minister of Secret, was a member of the Hungarian cabinet between 1990 and 2010. The minister was tasked with supervising the Information Office, the National Security Office and the National Security Service. The last minister was Gábor Juhász.

This page is a list of Ministers without portfolio for the Civilian Intelligence Services of Hungary.

Ministers of Civilian Intelligence Services (1990–2010)

Hungarian Republic (1989–2010)
Parties

See also
List of heads of state of Hungary
List of prime ministers of Hungary
List of Ministers of Agriculture of Hungary
List of Ministers of Croatian Affairs of Hungary
List of Ministers of Defence of Hungary
List of Ministers of Education of Hungary
List of Ministers of Finance of Hungary
List of Ministers of Foreign Affairs of Hungary
List of Ministers of Interior of Hungary
List of Ministers of Justice of Hungary
List of Ministers of Public Works and Transport of Hungary
Politics of Hungary

Secret Ministers